P̃ (majuscule: P̃, minuscule: p̃) is a Latin P with a diacritical tilde. It is or was used as a grapheme in some languages of Vanuatu, such as North Efate, South Efate and Namakura, to represent a sound . It is also used in the Yanesha language.

The letter was introduced by missionaries and has been in use for over a hundred years.

In Bislama, the lingua franca of Vanuatu, p with tilde is called snekpi "snake-P".

Computer encoding
Unicode encodes p with tilde with a combining diacritical mark, rather than a precomposed character. As such, the tilde may not align properly with some fonts and systems.
In standard HTML code: majuscule P&#771;, minuscule p&#771;.
The Unicode HTML hex code is: minuscule &#x0070;&#x0303;, majuscule &#x0050;&#x0303;.
The Unicode HTML decimal code is: minuscule &#112;&#771;, majuscule &#80;&#771;.

References

Latin letters with diacritics